Anchomenidius feldmanni is a species of ground beetle from the Platyninae subfamily that is endemic to Spain.

References

Beetles described in 2001
Endemic fauna of Spain
Beetles of Europe